The following is a list of Michigan State Historic Sites in Clinton County, Michigan. Sites marked with a dagger (†) are also listed on the National Register of Historic Places in Clinton County, Michigan.


Current listings

See also
 National Register of Historic Places listings in Clinton County, Michigan

Sources
 Historic Sites Online – Clinton County. Michigan State Housing Developmental Authority. Accessed January 23, 2011.

References

Clinton County
State Historic Sites
Tourist attractions in Clinton County, Michigan